Jeffrey Brian Yagher (born January 18, 1961) is an American actor.

Personal life
Born in Lawrence, Kansas, he graduated from Ohio State University and then attended the Yale School of Drama, where he appeared in productions of The Vultures, We Can't Pay, We Won't Play, and Las Madres. His younger brother Kevin Yagher is a special effects technician. Yagher's second marriage is to actress Megan Gallagher, and they have two children together.

Career
His television debut was in V: The Series as Kyle Bates. He starred in the pilot of 21 Jump Street as Tommy Hanson. He played both lead roles in The Twilight Zone episode "The Once And Future King", portraying both an Elvis impersonator and the real Elvis Presley, with a split screen used to allow him to appear alongside himself. He appeared in an episode of Newhart as Stoney and in the Seinfeld episode "The Rye" as John Jermaine, a jazz musician who dates Elaine Benes. He starred in the TV movie Bionic Showdown: The Six Million Dollar Man and the Bionic Woman along with Sandra Bullock in 1989. He appeared in several episodes of Six Feet Under, playing Hoyt Woodworth, in 2004. He appeared in Without a Trace (2007) and Bones (2009).

His film credits include Dead Man's Folly (1986), Big Bad Mama II (1987), Shag (1989), My Fellow Americans (1996), The Pandora Project (1998), and View from the Top (2003).

Filmography

Film

Television

References

External links

1961 births
Living people
American male television actors
American male film actors
People from Lawrence, Kansas
Male actors from Kansas